Beasley may refer to:

Places

United States
 Beasley, Tennessee, an unincorporated community
 Beasley, Texas, a city 
 Beasley (Tampa), a neighborhood within the City of Tampa, Florida

Elsewhere
 Beasley, Hamilton, a neighbourhood of the city in Ontario, Canada
 Beasley, Staffordshire, a suburb of Newcastle-under-Lyme in Staffordshire, England, United Kingdom

Other uses
 Beasley (surname)
 Beasley Broadcast Group, a Florida-based radio station company
 Beasley Coliseum, a multi-purpose venue at Washington State University
 Mrs. Beasley, doll carried around by character in American sitcom Family Affair
 Temple University Beasley School of Law, a law school at Temple University, Pennsylvania

See also
Beasley House (disambiguation)
 Beesley (disambiguation)
 Beazley (disambiguation)
 Besley, a surname
 Bissli, an Israeli wheat-based snack
 Bijli (disambiguation)
 Justice Beasley (disambiguation)